Fenway Park is the home of the Boston Red Sox.

Fenway may also refer to:
 Fenway-Kenmore, a neighborhood in Boston, Massachusetts, containing:
 Fenway (parkway), in the Emerald Necklace
 Fenway (MBTA station), light rail station on the Green Line
 Fenway Health, a network of health insurance providers in Massachusetts
 Fenway Park, a suburb of Chippenham, United Kingdom
 Fenway Recordings, a record label
 Fenway South, spring training facility of the Boston Red Sox